Red Bull King of the Air is the premier big air kiteboarding competition featuring the best athletes from around the World. Riders are judged based upon the height of their jumps, variety of tricks, and style.

The competition began in 2000 at Ho‘okipa, a beach known for windsurfing in Maui, Hawaii. After an 8-year hiatus, the competition was relaunched in 2013 in Blouberg Cape Town, South Africa, where it has been held annually since. The event is attended by over 7,000 people per day.

*2013-2015 had 4-person finals

References

External links 
 Red Bull King of the Air 2022: event info & videos
 Red Bull King of the Air: Learn more about the history and legends

Air sports
Kites
 
Surfing
Racing
Individual sports
Boardsports